Friedrich Horschelt (22 November 1824, Munich - 27 July 1881, Munich) was a German portrait painter.

Biography 
He was born to the ballet master, Friedrich Horschelt, and his wife, the dancer Barbara ("Babette") Eckner (1804–1889), who had been a soloist in the Munich ballet.

His first drawing lessons were with the history painter, Michael Echter. After 1841, he was a student at the Academy of Fine Arts, Munich. Beginning in 1847, he studied with Charles Gleyre in Paris, and held his first exhibit at the Salon in 1848.

He then returned to Munich, where he worked as a portrait painter. In 1854, he went to Vienna, with a letter of recommendation from the former King of Bavaria, Ludwig I. Later, he worked in Pest. He returned to Munich in 1863.

The battle painter, Theodor Horschelt, was his younger brother.

References

Further reading 
 "Horschelt, Friedrich". In: Friedrich von Boetticher: Malerwerke des 19. Jahrhunderts. Beitrag zur Kunstgeschichte. Vol. 1/2, Boetticher's Verlag, Dresden 1895, pg.573
 "Horschelt, Friedrich". In: Hans Vollmer (Ed.): Allgemeines Lexikon der Bildenden Künstler von der Antike bis zur Gegenwart, Vol.17: Heubel–Hubard. E. A. Seemann, Leipzig 1924, pg.528.
 Lisa Hackmann: "Horschelt, Friedrich", In: Bénédicte Savoy, France Nerlich (Eds.): Pariser Lehrjahre. Ein Lexikon zur Ausbildung deutscher Maler in der französischen Hauptstadt. Vol. 2: 1844–1870. de Gruyter, Berlin/Boston 2015 

1824 births
1881 deaths
19th-century German painters
19th-century German male artists
German portrait painters
Academy of Fine Arts, Munich alumni
Artists from Munich